A Certain Kind of Silence (Czech: Tiché doteky) is a 2019 Czech thriller film directed by Michal Hogenauer. It stars Eliška Křenková.

Cast
 Eliška Křenková as Mia
 Jacob Jutte as Sebastian
 Monic Hendrickx as Mother
 Roeland Fernhout as Father
 Sigrid ten Napel as Adela
 Elisa Beuger as Lady of the Agency
 Genio de Groot as Doctor Harford
 Andris Keiss as Carl
 Matthijs Ijgosse as Thor

Reception

Accolades

References

External links
 
 A Certain Kind of Silence at CSFD.cz 

2019 films
Czech thriller drama films
Dutch-language films
2010s German-language films
English-language Czech films
English-language German films
2019 thriller drama films
2010s English-language films
Czech multilingual films